Trần Văn Lý (born 20 February 1927) was a Vietnamese long-distance runner. He competed in the men's 10,000 metres at the 1952 Summer Olympics.

References

External links
 

1927 births
Possibly living people
Athletes (track and field) at the 1952 Summer Olympics
Vietnamese male long-distance runners
Olympic athletes of Vietnam
Place of birth missing